Diamond Bakery is a Jewish bakery located on Fairfax Avenue in Los Angeles. Founded in 1946 by Betty and Jack Segal, the bakery was sold to a group of Holocaust survivors in 1969, and sold again to a group of its employees shortly before the COVID-19 pandemic. In 2021, it again came under new ownership after financial trouble during the pandemic led head baker Ramon Luna to consider shutting the bakery down.

In addition to sales of baked goods at its storefront, Diamond Bakery sells wholesale goods to various Jewish delis and synagogues in the Los Angeles area.

History

Establishment
Diamond Bakery was established in 1946 by Betty Segal and Jack Segal, immigrants from Eastern Europe who brought their recipes with them. The bakery's sourdough starter is believed to have been active for more than a century, which would make it older than the bakery itself. The bakery was initially in Boyle Heights, Los Angeles, before being moved to Fairfax Avenue, where it remains.

The Lottmans and Rubensteins
In 1969, the Segals sold Diamond Bakery to two couples, the Lottmans and Rubensteins. Both the Lottmans and the Rubensteins were Holocaust survivors; some literature suggests that the couples first met at Auschwitz concentration camp. Mark Lottman, son of the Lottmans involved in the purchase, subsequently managed the bakery.

Sale to employees
Shortly before the COVID-19 pandemic, Mark Lottman sold Diamond Bakery to its longtime head baker Ramon Luna and a group of other employees. The employees pooled their money in order to make the purchase. Luna's son Raymond Luna served as president of the bakery, and before the pandemic purchased the bakery's first card reader and coffee bar as well as installing chalkboard menus. However, the loss of both foot traffic and wholesaling opportunities due to the pandemic forced Luna to consider closing permanently. Hours were cut to avoid layoffs. In July 2020, Diamond Bakery had made baked goods available on various online food ordering platforms and started a GoFundMe campaign with the goal of raising $400,000 to stay open.

Hollander and Weinstein

In early 2021, Brian Hollander and Doug Weinstein drove to Los Angeles from their hometown of Santa Barbara, California, to visit Canter's deli. Hollander and Weinstein, who had become friends while cooking meals for the elderly and baking challah with the Jewish Federation of Greater Santa Barbara, visited Diamond Bakery after Canter's; the two establishments are located on adjacent blocks. Luna and Weinstein had already met, and Luna gave the two men a tour. They decided to purchase Diamond Bakery before leaving, and began brainstorming a business plan while driving back to Santa Barbara. Weinstein, an experienced pastry chef, became chief operating officer and director of bakery operations, while Hollander became chief operating officer and director of business operations. Hollander also became director of L'Dor V'Dough, the newly established nonprofit arm of the bakery. Luna was named the chief baking officer.

Hollander and Weinstein implemented a profit sharing model in which shares in the bakery are set aside for the employees and pay out in the form of bonus pay and retirement packages, and additionally gave all employees a pay raise. On June 28, 2021, Diamond Bakery held a re-opening event.

Activity
Diamond Bakery supplies breads, bagels, and other baked goods to various Jewish delis in the Los Angeles area, including Nate 'n Al's as well as Greenblatt's prior to its closure, and to synagogues including the Wilshire Boulevard Temple. The bakery also sells baked goods at its storefront on Fairfax Avenue, where activity increases on important Jewish holidays.

References

External links
 
 Keeping the 100-year-old starter alive in the Fairfax District on KCRW Good Food podcast

1946 establishments in California
Bakeries of California
Fairfax, Los Angeles